The year 2006 is the 5th year in the history of the Universal Reality Combat Championship, a mixed martial arts promotion based in the Philippines. In 2006 the URCC held 2 events beginning with, URCC 8: Undisputed.

Events list

URCC 8: Undisputed

URCC 8: Undisputed was an event held on May 20, 2006 at The Arena in San Juan, Metro Manila, Philippines.

Results

URCC 9: Unstoppable

URCC 9: Unstoppable was an event held on December 2, 2006 at The Arena in San Juan, Metro Manila, Philippines.

Results

References

Universal Reality Combat Championship events
2006 in mixed martial arts